Andrey John "Andy" Remic (26 July 1971 – 26 February 2022) was a British author of thrillers, science fiction and military science fiction. He was also an indie filmmaker.

Life and career 
Born in 1971 to Yugoslav emigrant Nikolas Remic and British-born Sarah Ann Bragger, Andy Remic was first published in 2003 through Orbit Books with his fast-paced action SF thriller, Spiral, and has since written over twenty novels including the Clockwork Vampire Chronicles (a fantasy series), the Blood Dragon Empire grimdark fantasy novels, and A Song For No Man's Land, dark fantasy set during the First World War. His books have been translated into six languages.

Remic previously worked as an English teacher at Counthill School and Branston Community Academy in Branston, Lincolnshire, England. 

Remic wrote and directed indie films, originally for the UK-based independent film company Anarchy Films, then for RAM films, and in 2015 released his directorial debut film Impurity. Recently he made films about the iconic ZX Spectrum computer, notably Memoirs of a Spectrum Addict, which received "Pick of the Month" in Retro Gamer Magazine, followed by Spectrum Addict: LOAD "FILM2" in 2018.

Remic wrote a number of computer games when he was a child, including several text adventures for the ZX Spectrum in the 1980s and early 1990s. Some of these appeared on the cover-mounted cassettes that accompanied Crash magazine, and others were sold by mail order. Many of his games were produced under the name Psychaedelic Hedgehog Software.

Remic died from complications from cancer on 26 February 2022, at the age of 50, leaving behind his wife Linda and two children.

Bibliography

Spiral 
 Spiral (Orbit, 2003)
 Quake (Orbit, 2004)
 Warhead (Orbit, 2005)

Combat K 
 War Machine (Solaris, 2007)
 BioHell (Solaris, 2009)
 Hardcore (Solaris, 2010)
 Cloneworld (Solaris, 2011)

Clockwork Vampire Chronicles 
 Kell's Legend (Angry Robot, 2010)
 Soul Stealers (Angry Robot, 2010)
 Vampire Warlords (Angry Robot, 2011)
 Omnibus (Angry Robot, 2012)

Rage of Kings 
 The Iron Wolves (Angry Robot, 2014)
 The White Towers (Angry Robot, 2014)

A Song for No Man’s Land 
 A Song for No Man’s Land (Tor-Forge, 2016)
 Return of Souls (Tor-Forge,  2016)
 The Iron Beast (Tor-Forge, 2016)

Standalone works 
 Serial Killers Incorporated (Anarchy Books, 2011)
 SIM (Anarchy Books, 2011)
 Theme Planet (Solaris Books, 2012)
 Toxicity (Solaris Books, 2012)

Anthologies 
 Legends 2: Stories in Honour of David Gemmell (NewCon Press, 2015, ASIN B00YMDLVQ8)

Filmography
Memoirs of a Spectrum Addict
Spectrum Addict Load "Film2"
Memoirs of a Spectrum Addict 2.5 The Lost Tapes
8-Bit wars (in production)

References

External links

Anarchy Books

Andy Remic ZX-Spectrum games at WOS
Andy Remic interview at Punktalk

1971 births
2022 deaths
English male novelists
English science fiction writers
Writers from Manchester